The Monacan Indian Nation is one of eleven Native American tribes recognized since the late 20th century by the U.S. state of Virginia. In January 2018, the United States Congress passed an act to provide federal recognition as tribes to the Monacan and five other tribes in Virginia. They had earlier been so disrupted by land loss, warfare, intermarriage, and discrimination that the main society believed they no longer were "Indians". However, the Monacan reorganized and asserted their culture.

In the 21st century, the Monacan nation is located primarily in their traditional territory of Virginia's Piedmont region, particularly in Amherst County near Lynchburg. As of 2018 the Monacan Indian Nation has approximately 2,000 members. There are satellite groups in West Virginia, Maryland, Tennessee, and Ohio.

The Monacan nation was first recorded by Jamestown settlers in colonial Virginia. Their native language is a Siouan language which is extinct. The people are related to other Siouan-speaking tribes of the inland in this region, such as the Tutelo, Saponi and Occaneechi.

17th century

When Jamestown settlers first explored the James River in May 1607, they learned that the James River Monacan (along with their northern Mannahoac allies on the Rappahannock River) controlled the area of the Piedmont between the Fall Line (where present-day Richmond developed) and the Blue Ridge Mountains. The Monacan were hostile competitors with the Powhatan confederacy, a group of thirty Algonquian-speaking tribes who controlled much of the Tidewater and coastal plain. The weroance Parahunt, son of paramount chief Powhatan of the Powhatan confederacy, persuaded Captain Christopher Newport not to venture beyond the James River falls into Monacan country.

However, the determined Newport made an expedition into Monacan country the following year in November 1608. On a  march, the settlers found two Monacan towns, whose names they recorded as Massinacak and Mowhemenchough. Unlike the Powhatan, who had given the settlers lavish welcomes, the Monacan largely ignored them and went about their business. The settlers captured their chief and forced him to guide them around his territory. On November 26, 1608, Peter Wynne, a member of Newport's party to the Monacan villages, wrote a letter to John Egerton informing him that some members of the party believed the pronunciation of the Monacans' language resembled "Welch" (Welsh), which Wynne spoke. Newport had asked Wynne to act as interpreter, but the language was not Welsh and he could not understand it.

Mowhemencho, the Monacan nation's easternmost outpost, was between Bernard's Creek and Jones Creek in the eastern tip of present-day Powhatan County. Massinacak (Mahock) was at the mouth of Mohawk Creek, a mile south of present-day Goochland. The Monacan capital was Rassawek, located at the point within the two branches, Point of Fork, of the upper James and Rivanna rivers.  Tributary to them were the Monahassanugh (later known as the Nahyssan, i.e. Tutelo), whose town was near what later developed as Wingina, and the Monasukapanough (later known as the Saponi), living near present-day Charlottesville. All these groups were closely related with the Siouan Manahoac to the north.

In 1656 several hundred Nahyssan, Mahock, and Rechahecrians (possibly Iroquoian-speaking Erie from present-day Pennsylvania) threatened both the Powhatan tribes and the settlers by camping near the James falls.  A combined force of the Powhatan and settlers was sent to dislodge them. The Pamunkey chief Totopotomoi was slain in the resulting battle. Historically the Monacan and Erie were trade allies, especially copper.

The Monacan towns of Mowhemencho and Mahock were still occupied in 1670, when John Lederer and Major Harris recorded visiting them; they found that the men possessed muskets.  Lederer recorded their tradition that they had settled in the area on account of an oracle 400 years earlier, having been driven from the northwest by an enemy nation.  They told him they had found it occupied by the Doeg, whom they eventually displaced, in the meantime teaching them the art of growing corn.

He recorded another Monacan tradition as follows: "From four women, viz. Pash, Sepoy, Askarin, and Maraskarin, they derive the race of mankinde; which they therefore divide into four tribes, distinguished under those several names."

At the time of Lederer's visit, the tribe had about 30 bowmen or warriors, out of a total population of perhaps 100.  Lederer also noted the towns of Sapon and Pintahae on the Staunton River. Batts and Fallam recorded the latter town as Hanahaskie in 1671. The 20th-century ethnologist Swanton considers this last to be a Nahyssan village. Around 1675 the Nahyssan settled on an island at the confluence of the Stanton and Dan rivers, upriver of the Occaneechi people.

In 1677, the Monacan chief Surenough was one of several native signatories to the Treaty of Middle Plantation following Bacon's Rebellion. Virginian settlers and the Pamunkey encountered them, and the Manahoac, on the Upper Mattaponi and North Anna rivers in 1684.

By 1699, the Monacan had abandoned their homeland, moving farther away due to European encroachment. The Virginian House of Burgesses granted much of the former site of Mowhemencho to French Huguenot refugees, who were settled on both sides of the James River in 1700 and 1701. First promised land at Jamestown, they were forced by the Virginian colonial government to settle above the falls. In Goochland County, they established the villages of Manakin and Sabot, today known as Manakin-Sabot, Virginia.

Although a few Monacan lingered in the area as late as 1702, the core remnant seems to have merged with the Nahyssan and other closely related Virginia Siouan tribes, by then known generally as Tutelo-Saponi.  Under this collective name, the bulk of the tribe may be traced to North Carolina (1702), and back to Virginia (Fort Christanna, 1714).  They headed north to join the Iroquois around the Great Lakes for protection, and were noted in Pennsylvania (Shamokin, by 1740); and in western New York at Coreorgonel by 1753, where they joined the Cayuga.  They participated with them in the American Revolutionary War as allies of the British against the Patriots.  After the war, the Monacan went with the Iroquois to Canada.  They were settled at the (Six Nation Reserve of the Grand River First Nation) in present-day Ontario.  Their settlement of Tutelo Heights was noted in 1779. By the early 20th century, their descendants in Ontario had been largely absorbed by the Cayuga tribe through intermarriage.

Smaller bands are believed to have split off in North Carolina, and at several locations across Virginia.

Origins and legends of modern tribe

After Peter Wynne's expedition of 1608, the Monacan are one of the groups who have been conjectured to be "Welsh Indians". Historians have found no evidence for that and treat it as myth. The Monacan language was part of the Siouan language family.

In 1831–1833, William Johns, an ancestor of some of today's Monacan, purchased  of land on Bear Mountain for a settlement of families related to him. In 1850, the census recorded 29 families there.

Over time, Native Americans in Virginia intermarried with Europeans and African Americans. Whites assumed that meant that they no longer identified as Indians, but were mistaken. In 1924, Virginia passed a Racial Integrity Act, which instituted a binary system of racial classification as black or white only. It also included the one-drop rule, requiring classification as black of a person with any known African ancestry. The director of the department of vital records insisted on reclassifying specific families as black, although they had long been recorded as Indian. This program ignored how people identified socially and culturally, and disrupted decades of records, causing American Indians in Virginia to lose historical continuity. But they kept their culture and community, and reorganized in the 20th century to regain recognition as Native American peoples.

In 1926 Mongrel Virginians: The WIN Tribe, a study of a mixed-race group in the Blue Ridge Mountains, was published by the Carnegie Institution. The author described the group as "degenerate".  The author referred to the group as the WIN tribe, for White-Indian-Negro, because he was disguising the name of the group, the surnames of its members, the county which was studied – every fact about them. Some contemporary academic reviewers strongly criticized and ridiculed the book and its reliance on community anecdotes to make judgments about families and individuals.

When ancestors of current Monacan families entered the U.S. military to serve in the world wars, they resisted accepting the classification of "colored", which the state of Virginia had tried impose on them.

In 1946 the researcher William Harlan Gilbert Jr. described the Monacan in his "Memorandum Concerning the Characteristics of the Larger Mixed-Blood Racial Islands of the Eastern United States".  Edward T. Price had a study in 1953, "A Geographical Analysis of White-Negro-Indian Racial Mixtures in the Eastern United States ". Both used the former name for the group, "Issues", generally used to refer to free people of color, most of whom were mixed-race, who were free before the Civil War and general emancipation. Both authors considered the Issues (sometimes called "Old Issues") to be tri-racial.

The Episcopal Church ran a primary school (Bear Mountain Indian Mission School) for the children of this community at Bear Mountain near Amherst, Virginia. There was no high school education available. In 1963, Amherst County proposed a $30,000 bond to build a school for the mission community. The proposal was voted down, and 23 students applied for transfer to public schools. The state approved their applications and the mission school closed.

Claims and recognition as Native American
In the early 1980s, Peter Houck, a local physician, published Indian Island in Amherst County, in which he speculated that the free people of color in the region during the antebellum era were in part descendants of the Monacan tribe.  While this population had claimed an Indian cultural identity since the turn of the 20th century, Houck was the first to link some of them to the Monacan tribal identity. Prior to Houck's book, most people claiming Native American ancestry in that vicinity had identified as Cherokee, which were well-known in the Southeast. Many of the local families continue to claim Cherokee instead of Monacan ancestry.

In 1988, the Monacan Tribe incorporated as a nonprofit organization to establish its presence. In 1989, the tribe was officially recognized by the State of Virginia. Other tribes recognized by the state include the Chickahominy, Eastern Chickahominy, Mattaponi, Nansemond, Pamunkey, Rappahannock, Upper Mattaponi, Patawomeck, Nottoway, and Cheroenhaka (Nottoway) tribes.

On January 30, 2018, federal recognition status was granted to the Monacan Nation and five other tribes in Virginia through passage by Congress of the Thomasina E. Jordan Indian Tribes of Virginia Federal Recognition Act of 2017. President Trump signed the bill approved by both houses of Congress.

Celebration
Today the Monacan Indian Nation operates a yearly powwow in May, and a homecoming celebration in October.  A model of an ancient Monacan village has been constructed as part of Natural Bridge (Virginia) State Park, in nearby Rockbridge County.

References

Further reading

 Houck, Peter W. Indian Island in Amherst County.  Lynchburg: Lynchburg Historical Research Co., 1984.
 Estabrook, Arthur H. & McDougle, Ivan E. Mongrel Virginians: The WIN Tribe. Washington: Carnegie Institution, 1926.

External links
 Monacan Indian Nation, official site

 
Native American tribes in Virginia
Federally recognized tribes in the United States
African–Native American relations
Siouan peoples
Native American tribes in West Virginia
Native American tribes in Maryland
Native American tribes in Ohio
State-recognized tribes in the United States